Witness was a French grunge band. The band was formed in 1989 and released two albums and three EPs. The band split in 2001.

Biography
Witness was created in 1989 and was composed of former members of Blue Bird. Their music is mainly based on 1970s blues rock and hard rock. The original line-up was Cyril as the vocalist, Bob as the drummer and Paco and Manu shared guitar and bass guitar.  At the time, the band played some gigs on small stages. Eventually, Paco moved to playing the guitar primarily, while Manu officially became the band's bass guitar player. The band enlarged its playlist and performed more often in its home region, the Sarthe, but also in Brittany. Witness took part in various festivals and opened for Calvin Russel. Around 1992, many important events occurred: the band did numerous concerts (72 in a timespan of a year), recorded on an entirely DIY demo cassette (First Shoot), and turned more stylistically towards hard rock. The following year, Witness hit the road and opens for alternative rock bands throughout France, playing at several festivals.

In 1994, the band recorded a darker five-track disk named after the band, played for 15,000 people at Le Mans 24h motorbike race, and planned to do many more festival concerts. The band's style changed to a more grunge-like type of music, and they recorded another DIY cassette: the eight-song Smooth. This work was followed by a 15-track album having the same name in 1996, released by Move On Prod. Gilles, who had already played guitar on some recordings, eventually becoming a full-time member of the band soon after. This five-member line-up appeared on stage during Rennes' Transmusicales that same year, as well as on other occasions. In 1997, the members of the band shared an unplugged experience in bars and show-cases that can be heard on Elec-oustic.

Witness went back in the studio in January 1998 to record Grimace, with many guest appearances contributing to the electric album. Unfortunately, Bob was severely injured in May. Dennis became the drummer for a while before leaving the job to Yann, who had already helped out with percussions on Grimace. Bruno, who played the keyboards parts on the album, shared a few stages with them before taking part in some further recordings. Bob returned as a drummer in 1999, even though he was still suffering from the effects of his accident. The band then recorded a few demos in its home studio, to prepare the Avatar album. The band performed on stage for a while, but Bob was forced to leave his drumming to Yann once again during spring 2000, mainly because his handicap was making it difficult for him to endure the band's long sets and unleashed live energy.
 
Soon after, the band published a four-track demo. The recording sessions for Avatar took place from the summer 2000 on until 2001 at the Master Studio with Thierry Chassang, who had already worked on Grimace. The band released a three-track demo the same year. Witness opened for Popa Chubby at Le Mans' 24h and gave its last concert in September, before dissolving two months later.

Members
Cyril Mercier: vocals (1989-2001)
Pascal Berthault: guitar (1989-2001)
Gilles Laurent: guitar (1996–2001)
Emmanuel Berthault: bass, vocals (1989-2001)
Yann Kaddachi: drums (2000–2001)
Patrick Bourgoin: drums (1989–1998 / 1999-2000)
Bruno Lebreton: Fender Rhodes (1999-2001)
Denis Cochin: drums (1998)

Discography

Albums 
 1996: Smooth
 1998: Grimace
 2018: 24H Live (live album) (recorded in 2001 at 24 Heures Du Mans Moto)

EPs 
 1994: Witness
 1997: Elec-Oustic
 1999: Witness
 2001: Word Give

Demos 
 1992: First Shoot (cassette)
 1995: Smooth (cassette)
 (date unknown): Witness (cassette)

Tribute albums 
 2008: We Were Born to Destroy

References

External links
Witness Grunge
Witness | Listen and Stream Free Music, Albums, New Releases, Photos, Videos
Discogs

French rock music groups
Musical groups established in 1989
Musical groups disestablished in 2001
French grunge groups
Musical groups from Pays de la Loire